The coat of arms of Guernsey is the official symbol of the Channel Island of Guernsey. It is very similar to the arms of Normandy, Jersey and England.

Seal of Guernsey
The Seal of Guernsey closely follows the Coat of Arms, it originates from 1279 when a single seal was provided by Edward I for joint use in Guernsey and Jersey. The seal comprised 3 Luparts, leopards (or lions).  By 1304 separate seals were provided for each Bailiwick.

The shape of the sprig or "Rameau" on the top of the seal has changed over the centuries. Bailiff Daniel de L'Isle Brock commissioned a replacement seal in 1832 the lions or leopards becoming a caricature of true heraldic beasts. The head of the beasts took on a shape approximating to that of a shield, the mane was virtually non-existent, the body was somewhat extended and the legs were so thin they could not carry an animal. Bailiff Sir Edgar McCulloch in 1884 reverted to the traditional heraldic representation.

See also
 Flag of Guernsey
 Coat of arms of Jersey
 States of Guernsey

References 

National symbols of Guernsey
Guernsey
Guernsey